Askje Church is a parish church of the Church of Norway in the large Stavanger Municipality in Rogaland county, Norway. It is located in the village of Askje on the island of Mosterøy. It is the main church for the Mosterøy parish which is part of the Tungenes prosti (deanery) in the Diocese of Stavanger. The white, wooden church was built in a long church design in 1846 using designs by the architect Hans Linstow. The church seats about 220 people.

History
The earliest existing historical records of the church date back to the year 1381, but the church was likely established in the 13th century. The original church may have been a stave church. Over the centuries, the church was partially rebuilt. In 1815, the parish priest described the small, dilapidated church as follows: "Askøe church can hardly be distinguished from the farm's outbuildings. It is so small that when one stands on either side of the aisle, it is difficult for another to get past without turning sideways." The small, old church was torn down in 1846 and replaced on the same site with a new church. The new church was consecrated in 1846.

See also
List of churches in Rogaland

References

Churches in Stavanger
Wooden churches in Norway
19th-century Church of Norway church buildings
Churches completed in 1846
13th-century establishments in Norway